Chongbong Band is a North Korean light music choir and orchestra. The group consists of seven members: singers and instrumentalists playing mainly brass instruments. According to KCNA, the band members are instrumentalists of the Wangjaesan Art Troupe and singers of the Moranbong Band's chorus.

The Chongbong Band was formed in late July 2015. The creation of the band has been attributed to North Korean leader Kim Jong-un. The Chongbong Band's appearance at the time that another pop group, the Moranbong Band, disappeared sparked rumors about it being a replacement for the latter. However, the Moranbong Band reappeared on 7 September 2015, a week after the Chongbong Band made its public debut in Moscow, Russia.

History

Creation
The group was formed on 28 July 2015. Its creation has been attributed to Kim Jong-un. Kim's wife, Ri Sol-ju, was also involved in its creation. Chongbong Band, much like Moranbong Band also attributed to Kim Jong-un, was created to produce "music 'for the people.

According to South Korean media and Radio Free Asia, Chongbong Band replaced Moranbong Band whose former members disappeared from the public. Some of them reportedly left the band to get married and others were deported out of the country. Moranbong band, however, returned on 7 September 2015 to perform in a concert attended by Kim Jong-un.

Debut
In August–September 2015, the band performed with the State Merited Chorus in two concerts in Moscow, Russia: at the Tchaikovsky Concert Hall on 31 August and at the Moskvich Cultural Center on 1 September. The performances in Russia were the band's public debut. The choice of venue in Russia has been interpreted as a signal of hopes of strengthening economic ties between North Korea and Russia.

Other performances
On 11 October 2015, the band performed in the people's theater, Pyongyang on the occasion of the 70th birthday of the Workers' Party of Korea. On the 19th of the same month, the Chongbong Band performed the same concert in front of Kim Jong-un and his wife Ri Sol-ju. Also attending the concert were members and directors from the Moranbong Band, members of the State Merited Chorus, other artistes and people from Pyongyang. They performed on 1 January 2016, in a New Year's concert at the People's Palace of Culture.

See also

Music of North Korea
List of North Korean musicians

References

External links
Discography with information about the band

North Korean orchestras
Musical groups established in 2015
All-female bands
2015 establishments in North Korea